Sleepwalker is a 2017 psychological mystery film directed by Elliott Lester, and starring Ahna O'Reilly.

Plot 

Ever since her famous author husband, Jonathan Grey, committed suicide, college student Sarah Foster has suffered a sleep disorder involving sleepwalking. Her former professor, Dr. Elaine Cooper, suggests a sleep clinic.

In the sleep laboratory Dr. Koslov and Dr. Scott White explain her neural activity will be observed. Sarah has a dreamless night and awakes in a different room. Koslov says they moved her and suggests more nights in the lab for observation.

That day, a professor calls Sarah "Miss Wells" instead of Foster. Others, including her roommate Dawn, confirm her last name is Wells. Her driver’s license, diary, a dedication in her husband’s book – are all written as Sarah Wells. Koslov shows a form she filled out detailing a dream of being chased by a woman. Sarah reiterates she didn’t dream and tries to show that it's not her handwriting, but as she writes, the handwritings match. Sarah has another dreamless sleep in the lab. 

Sarah inquires at the library about selective memory loss, and learns that partial retrograde amnesia usually resolves on its own but if hallucinations develop, it might be psychosis. Back in her apartment, Dawn is absent and a girl Sarah has never met named Nicole claims to live there as her roommate. A man phones Sarah to say he knows her and has been watching her. Cooper doesn’t remember her. In a nightmare someone suffocates her with a plastic bag.

Sarah awakes in the night in a strange house. She walks to her apartment but sees Nicole and another girl inside and she is locked out. The two women leave in the morning and Sarah breaks in by smashing the window. Another person’s belongings are in her room, including clothes too big for her. The mysterious man calls and taunts her. She spends the night in the apartment block laundry room closet and sees water seeping under the door.

The next morning, Dawn is back, the window is no longer broken, and her belongings are in her room. She visits White at home and recounts her changing realities. He calls Cooper, who remembers her. White tells Sarah her unusual sleep patterns might affect her perception.

Near her apartment, a dark-haired man starts to chase her. Suddenly White is parked next to her in his truck. He takes her back to his home, where he explains that when we dream, the rational part of our brain uses stories to make sense of emotions. Sarah insists the house she woke up in was real, and she associates the house with fear – she is running from a woman who lives in the house.

That night, Sarah dreams she is encased in plastic. Waking, she finds herself in the strange house, where a woman is sleeping in a bed. The woman wakes and fearfully tells Sarah to go away. Back at her apartment the big clothes are back and there is cardboard over the window.

In the sleep lab, Koslov doesn’t recognize her and completely different man introduces himself as White. He says he knows Sarah Wells, but she isn’t her. Sarah leaves for her campus lecture hall where a professor is showing a quote: “It is not necessary to know exactly who we are. Our purpose in life is to become something other than what we were when we began.” The woman from her dreams is in the audience and seems to recognize Sarah. Sarah goes to her apartment and sees police out front. She hides in the laundry room closet and water seeps under the door again.

Sarah awakes in the sleep laboratory with the original White, who tells her the police found her sleepwalking. He brought her to the laboratory to monitor. Although she remembers nothing, data shows she dreamed the entire night. White thinks the stalker might be an anchor connecting the two worlds and asks why her husband committed suicide. Although she wrote his note in her diary, she cannot remember.

Sarah reads her diary in her apartment. On the library computer she finds a news report that Jonathan Gray was murdered by a fan. She is certain her husband died by suicide; even Cooper confirmed it.

Sarah returns to her apartment with the window intact, where the dark haired man springs out and tries to suffocate her. Sarah locks herself in a room. The attacker trashes the apartment before leaving. Sarah calls White who immediately runs over to find her apartment untouched.

Cooper recommends Sarah receive help and be kept safe until her episodes resolve. White promises to stay with her at a clinic. Arriving in the clinic, Sarah tries to flee in panic and is restrained to a bed. White leaves, promising to return in the morning.

Cooper assures White he’s doing the right thing, but she doesn’t know his patient and denies having met them earlier. White drives back to the hospital and takes Sarah home. 

Sarah remembers her stalker’s name - Warren Lambert - and that he is obsessed with Jonathan’s books. She knows the apartment attack was not real; it was a memory breaking through. She remembers she left Jonathan over his affair with a fan who then shot Jonathan.

That night Sarah's stalker attacks her suffocating her face with a plastic bag. White knocks him down. The police come and identify him as a repeat offender. He has Sarah’s ID as Sarah Foster. Sarah and White make love.

In the night, Sarah sleepwalks to the sleep laboratory where she sees the unknown woman sleeping. The scene changes and she sees the woman in bed in the unknown house. Sarah asks, “Who are you?” The woman wakes up in panic and tells her to "go away, get out of here." Sarah returns to the lab, where the woman is still sleeping. The woman wakes and tells her to “go away” again. The alternate White rushes in and calls the woman “Sarah.” The alternate Sarah asks if he can see the woman in a nightgown by the window but he cannot. The original White joins the original Sarah, who tells him the unknown woman dreams about her.

The original White finds a video statement by the woman saying she is being stalked by a woman who visits at night and watches her from across the street. Sarah realizes she is the other woman’s nightmare. In flashback, Sarah is revealed to be "Anna Wells" - the crazed fan who shot Jonathan when he ended the affair, then shot herself. The other woman is the real Sarah. The original White Anna has created in her imagination - in the image of Jonathan.

In a series of flashbacks Anna is gasping for breath in a coma bound to a hospital bed. A male nurse who looks like the attacker caresses her face, gently telling her, “Don’t worry Anna.” Water from a ventilator drips on her foot. She dreams she is sleepwalking and calls herself Sarah Foster.

Cast 
 Ahna O'Reilly as Sarah Wells / Anna
 Richard Armitage as Dr. Scott White
 Izabella Scorupco as Dr. Cooper
 Rachel Melvin as Dawn

 Kevin Zegers as Dr. Koslov

 Haley Joel Osment as Warren

Production 
Filming took place in Los Angeles in 2014.

Reception
THe Hollywood Reporter said, "the willfully vague plot gradually unravels as inexorably as the protagonist’s perception of reality."

References

External links 
 

2017 films
2010s mystery films
American mystery films
Films about sleep disorders
Films directed by Elliott Lester
Films set in Los Angeles
Films shot in Los Angeles
2010s English-language films
2010s American films